= Marcial Solis =

Honduras politician

Marcial Solis was the Honduras Minister of Education. He was formerly the head of Honduras' National Council of Education and Auditor of the National University of Agriculture (UNA). He replaced Rutilia Calderon. He was succeeded by Arnaldo Bueso.
